"I Wish I Wish" is a song by Lauren Bennett. The song was released on 21 November 2011 via Interscope Records.

Background
Her debut solo single "I Wish I Wish" was released on 21 November 2011 via Interscope Records. The track was written by Esmée Denters, Billy Mann and produced by David Schuler.

Track listings
Digital download
 "I Wish I Wish"

Release history

References

2011 debut singles
Songs written by Billy Mann
2011 songs